Louis Champagne is a Canadian talk radio personality, who is hosts a morning daily program on CKGS-FM in La Baie, Quebec. He was the longtime host of another daily program on CKRS-FM until November 2008. He is best known for controversial remarks he made during the 2007 Quebec election campaign, when he interviewed Lac-Saint-Jean Parti Québécois candidate Alexandre Cloutier on February 19, 2007.

Controversy

Sylvain Gaudreault, the PQ candidate in the neighbouring riding to Cloutier's, and André Boisclair, the Parti Québécois' leader during the election campaign, are both openly gay. During the interview, Champagne asked Cloutier,

When you show up during the campaign, listen, aren’t you going to face the question, "Is the Parti Québécois a club of fags?"

He also asserted that local factory workers would never vote for a tapette (the French language equivalent to "faggot".)

Aftermath
Both Cloutier and Gaudreault won their ridings on election night.

Champagne was suspended from the airwaves on March 6 pending an investigation by the station's owner, Corus Québec. He had also previously been the subject of complaints against the station by the Université du Québec à Chicoutimi and the Cégep de Jonquière.

On CKGS-FM La Baie
Longtime on CKRS, Louis Champagne is now host a new talk morning daily program on CKGS-FM in La Baie, effective on November 22, 2010.

References

French Quebecers
Living people
People from Saguenay, Quebec
Canadian talk radio hosts
Year of birth missing (living people)
2007 in Canadian politics